This is a list in alphabetical order of cricketers who have played for Nottinghamshire County Cricket Club in top-class matches since the club was founded in 1841. Like the Nottinghamshire county teams formed by earlier organisations, essentially the old Nottingham Cricket Club, the county club has always held first-class status. It has been a List A team since the beginning of limited overs cricket in 1963; and a top-class Twenty20 team since the inauguration of the Twenty20 Cup in 2003.

The details are the player's usual name followed by the years in which he was active as a Nottinghamshire player and then his name is given as it usually appears on match scorecards. Note that many players represented other top-class teams besides Nottinghamshire. Current players are shown as active to the latest season in which they played for the club. The list has been updated to the end of the 2021 cricket season using the data published in Playfair Cricket Annual, 2022 edition.

The list excludes Second XI and other players who did not play for the club's first team; and players whose first team appearances were in minor matches only. Players who represented the county before 1841 are included if they also played for the county club but excluded if not. Players who played only for Nottingham Cricket Club, which played some matches deemed first-class in the 19th century, are included in List of Nottingham Cricket Club players.

A

B

C

D

E
 Mark Ealham (2004–2009) : M. A. Ealham
 Richard Earle (1857–1861) : R. B. Earle
 Gordon Edwards (1973) : G. Edwards
 Neil Edwards (2010–2012) : N. J. Edwards
 William Elliott (1871–1875) : W. Elliott
 Bill Ellis (1948) : W. Ellis
 Henry Ellison (1897) : H. R. N. Ellison
 Michael Ellison (1852) : M. J. Ellison
 Scott Elstone (2010–2012) : S. L. Elstone
 Steve Elworthy (2003) : S. Elworthy
 Herbert Emmitt (1888) : H. W. Emmitt
 Henry Enfield (1869–1872) : H. Enfield
 Kevin Evans (1984–1999) : K. P. Evans
 Russell Evans (1985–1990) : R. J. Evans
 Joey Evison (2019–2021) : J. D. M. Evison

F

G

H

I
 Nigel Illingworth (1981–1983) : N. J. B. Illingworth
 Imad Wasim (2019–2020) : Imad Wasim
 Imran Tahir (2015–2016) : Imran Tahir
 Albert Iremonger (1906–1910) : A. Iremonger
 James Iremonger (1897–1914) : J. Iremonger

J
 John Jackson (1855–1866) : J. Jackson
 William Jackson (1848) : W. Jackson
 Charles James (1906–1921) : C. C. James
 Lyndon James (2018–2021) : L. W. James
 Phil Jaques (2014) : P. A. Jaques
 George Jarvis (1841) : G. Jarvis
 Will Jefferson (2007–2009) : W. I. Jefferson
 Arthur Jepson (1938–1959) : A. Jepson
 Alec Johnson (1963–1966) : A. A. Johnson
 Isaac Johnson (1840–1843) : I. Johnson
 Peter Johnson (1970–1977) : P. D. Johnson
 Paul Johnson (1981–2002) : P. Johnson
 Arthur Jones (1892–1914) : A. O. Jones
 David Jones (1935–1939) : D. Jones

K
 Gary Keedy (2014–2015) : G. Keedy
 Walter Keeton (1926–1952) : W. W. Keeton
 John Kelly (1953–1957) : J. Kelly
 Robert Kelsall (1969) : R. S. Kelsall
 Sam Kelsall (2011–2014) : S. Kelsall
 John Kesteven (1876) : J. Kesteven
 George Kettle (1843) : G. M. Kettle
 Sam King (2021) : S. I. M. King
 Lionel Kirk (1920–1929) : L. Kirk
 William Kirk (1888) : W. N. Kirk
 Lance Klusener (2002) : L. Klusener
 Joseph Knowles (1935–1946) : J. Knowles

L
 Dean Laing (1990) : D. R. Laing
 George Lane (1881) : G. Lane
 Harold Larwood (1924–1938) : H. Larwood
 Harry Latchman (1974–1976) : A. H. Latchman
 Garnet Lee (1910–1922) : G. M. Lee
 Chris Lewis (1992–1995) : C. C. Lewis
 Jake Libby (2014–2019) : J. D. Libby
 Ben Lilley (1921–1937) : B. Lilley
 Tinsley Lindley (1887–1893) : T. Lindley
 Vincent Lindo (1960) : C. V. Lindo
 Bill Lockwood (1886–1887) : W. H. Lockwood
 Richard Logan (2001–2004) : R. J. Logan
 Albert Longdon (1895) : A. Longdon
 Sam Lowe (1894) : S. Lowe
 Tom Lowe (1894) : T. Lowe
 Walter Lowe (1895) : W. G. H. Lowe
 David Lucas (1998–2004) : D. S. Lucas
 Michael Lumb (2012–2017) : M. J. Lumb

M

N
 Nirmal Nanan (1971–1980) : N. Nanan
 Dirk Nannes (2010) : D. P. Nannes
 Chris Nash (2018–2020) : C. D. Nash
 Joseph Need (1841–1855) : J. S. Need
 Frank Needham (1890–1891) : F. Needham
 Oliver Newby (2005) : O. J. Newby
 Mick Newell (1984–1994) : M. Newell
 Scott Newman (2009) : S. A. Newman
 Thomas Nixon (1841–1854) : T. Nixon
 Wayne Noon (1994–2003) : W. M. Noon
 Sam Northeast (2021) : S. A. Northeast
 Bernarr Notley (1949) : B. Notley
 Francis Noyes (1842–1848) : F. Noyes

O
 Archer Oates (1931–1933) : A. W. Oates
 Kevin O'Brien (2009) : K. J. O'Brien
 Thomas Oates (1897–1925) : T. W. Oates
 William Oates (1881–1882) : W. C. Oates
 Patrick Oakden (1960–1961) : R. P. Oakden
 Andrew Oram (1997–2000) : A. R. Oram
 Eric Oscroft (1950–1951) : E. Oscroft
 John Oscroft (1842–1848) : J. Oscroft
 John Oscroft (1867–1879) : J. T. Oscroft
 Percy Oscroft (1894–1900) : P. W. Oscroft
 William Oscroft (1863–1882) : W. Oscroft

P

R

S

T

U
 Arthur Underwood (1949–1954) : A. J. Underwood
 William Underwood (1881) : W. Underwood

V
 Pat Vaulkhard (1934) : P. Vaulkhard
 Daniel Vettori (2003) : D. L. Vettori
 Bill Voce (1927–1952) : W. Voce
 Adam Voges (2008–2012) : A. C. Voges
 Roger Vowles (1957–1961) : R. C. Vowles

W

Y
 Walter Yates (1937–1938) : W. G. Yates
 Younis Khan (2005) : Younis Khan

Notes

References

Bibliography
 

Players

Nottinghamshire
Cricketers